David Ross Locke (also known by his pseudonym Petroleum V. Nasby) (September 20, 1833February 15, 1888) was an American journalist and early political commentator during and after the American Civil War.

Biography

Early life
Locke was born in Vestal, Broome County, New York, the son of Nathaniel Reed Locke and Hester Locke.

Career
He was apprenticed at age 12 to the newspaper, the Democrat in Cortland County, New York.

Following a seven-year apprenticeship, he tramped around until his next protracted stay, with the Pittsburgh Chronicle. Around 1855, Locke started, with others, the Plymouth, Ohio Herald. On March 20, 1856, he became the editor of the Bucyrus Journal. By 1861 he had purchased and was the editor of The Jeffersonian in Findlay, Ohio, where he began writing his Nasby letters.

In 1861 Locke revived the Hancock Jeffersonian in Findlay, Ohio until he left in 1865 to edit the Toledo Blade.

Locke was in Bucyrus, Ohio when the Civil War began. Following the war, from October 15, 1865 he edited and wrote for the Toledo Blade in Toledo, Ohio, which he purchased in 1867.

Death
Locke died on February 15, 1888, in Toledo.

His work

Locke's most famous works, the "Nasby Letters", were written in the character of, and over the signature of "Rev. Petroleum V(esuvius) Nasby", a Copperhead and Democrat. They have been described as "the Civil War written in sulphuric acid".

Locke's fictional alter ego, Nasby, loudly champions the cause of the Confederate States of America from Secession onward, but does little to actively help it. After being conscripted into the Union Army he deserts to the Confederates, joining the fictional "Pelican Brigade".  However, he finds life in the Confederate Army "tite nippin" and soon deserts again. By the end of the Civil War he is back in civilian life.

The Nasby Letters, although written in the semi-literate spelling used by other humorists of the time, were a sophisticated work of ironic fiction.  They were consciously intended to rally support for the Union cause; "Nasby" himself was portrayed as a thoroughly detestable character — a supreme opportunist, bigoted, work-shy, often half-drunk, and willing to say or do anything to get a Postmaster's job. (Locke's own father had served as Postmaster of Virgil, New York.) At the time the Letters were written, postmaster positions were political plums, offering a guaranteed federal salary for little or no real work. Until the glorious day when he received a "Post Orfis" from Andrew Johnson, Nasby worked, when he worked, most frequently as a preacher. His favorite biblical texts, unsurprisingly, were the ones that were used by Southern ministers to "prove" that slavery was ordained by the Bible.

Abraham Lincoln loved the Nasby Letters, quoting them frequently. Lincoln is reported to have said, "I intend to tell him if he will communicate his talent to me, I will swap places with him!"

After the Civil War, Nasby went on to comment on Reconstruction. He settled in several different places, most notably "Confedrit X Roads,  is in the Stait of Kentucky", a fictional town full of idle, whiskey-loving, scrounging ex-Confederates, and a few hard-working, decent folk, who by an amazing coincidence were all strong Republicans. He traveled frequently, sometimes not entirely voluntarily (Nasby's habit of borrowing money he never repaid, and running up tabs at the local saloon often made him unpopular) and continued to comment on the issues of the day.

Locke discontinued the Nasby Letters a few years before his death, since the times had changed and Nasby was no longer topical.  While the semi-literate spelling in which they are written has often discouraged modern readers, it can also be seen as a point of characterizing "Nasby".

Several collections of the Letters came out in book form, some illustrated by Thomas Nast, who was a friend and political ally of Locke.

Works by Locke

 The Nasby papers: letters and sermons containing the views on the topics of the day of Petroleum V. Nasby (1864)
 Divers views, opinions, and prophecies of yoors trooly Petroleum V. Nasby (1865)  
 Swingin' Round the Cirkle (1866)  
 Swingin' Round the Cirkle, or Andy's trip to the West, together with a life of its hero (1866)
 Life of Androo Johnson (1866)
  Ekkoes from Kentucky (1867)  
 The impendin crisis uv the Dimocracy, bein a breef and concise statement uv the past experience, present condishun and fucher hopes uv the Dimokratic party; incloodin the most prominent reesons why evry Dimokrat who loves his party shood vote for Seemore and Blare, and agin Grant and Colfax (1868)
 The struggles (social, financial and political) of Petroleum V. Nasby ... embracing his trials and troubles, ups and downs, rejoicings and wailings, likewise his views of men and things; together with the lectures "Cussed be Canaan," "The struggles of a conservative with the woman question," and "In search of a man of sin" (1872)
  The Moral History of America’s Life-Struggle (1874), illustrated by Thomas Nast.
 Eastern fruit on western dishes; The morals of Abou Ben Adhem (1875) 
 Inflation at the cross roads being a history of the rise and fall of the Onlimited Trust and Confidence Company of Confedrit X roads, in a series of five letters  (1875)
 A Paper City (1878)  
 The Democratic John Bunyan being eleven dreams (1880)
  Hannah Jane(1881), a sentimental poem
 Nasby in exile: or, six months of travel in England, Ireland, Scotland, France, Germany, Switzerland and Belgium, with many things not of travel (1882)
 The demagogue, a political novel (1890)
 The Nasby letters. Being the original Nasby letters (1893)
 Petroleum V. Nasby on silver.  (1896)
 Civil War Letters of Petroleum V. Nasby, compiled with an introduction by Harvey S. Ford (1962)

References

External links

 
 
 

1833 births
1888 deaths
American humorists
19th-century American newspaper editors
People of New York (state) in the American Civil War
People of Ohio in the American Civil War
People from Vestal, New York
Writers from Toledo, Ohio
People from Bucyrus, Ohio
Journalists from New York (state)
American male journalists
19th-century American male writers
19th-century pseudonymous writers
Journalists from Ohio